Five elements may refer to:

Philosophy 
Classical elements
Godai (Japanese philosophy)
Gogyo, five phase Japanese philosophy
Wuxing (Chinese philosophy), ancient Chinese theory involving five 'phases', 'agents', or 'elements'
Mahābhūta, the five elements in Indian philosophy
Pancha Tattva (Vaishnavism)

Science 
Boron, element 5 in the periodic table
Group 5 element, elements in the fifth column of the periodic table
Period 5 element, elements in the fifth row of the periodic table

Music 
Five Elements, a band led by jazz musician Steve Coleman

See also 
Element (disambiguation)
Fifth Element (disambiguation)